Jonathan Eysseric and André Ghem were the defending champions but chose not to defend their title.

Laurynas Grigelis and Zdeněk Kolář won the title after defeating  Tomasz Bednarek and David Pel 6–3, 6–4 in the final.

Seeds

Draw

References
 Main Draw

Svijany Open - Doubles
2017 Doubles